This page lists comital families in the territories of the Austro-Hungarian Empire, whether extant or extinct. Mediatized counts (Reichsgrafen) were entitled to the style of Erlaucht (Illustrious Highness), while others bore the style of Hochgeboren (High Born). The Austrian comital title (Graf) was the second most prestigious title of the Austrian nobility, forming the higher nobility (hoher Adel) alongside the princes (Furst); this close inner circle, called the 100 Familien (100 families), possessed enormous riches and lands. They also had great influence at the court and thus played an important role in politics and diplomacy.

Nobility was formally abolished in Austria in 1919.

Where this section is blank, it is possible that the preposition is unknown or did not exist.

Comital families
The list of comital families from the Hungarian half of Austria-Hungary according to the 8th Law of 1886:

| width="30%" align="left" valign="top" style="border:0"|
 Almásy
 Althann
 Andrássy
 Apponyi
 Auersperg
 Baldasseroni
 Batthyány
 Bánffy
 Báthory
 Beckers
 Beleznay
 Bellegarde
 Benyovszky
 Berchtold
 Berényi
 Bethlen
 Béldi
 Bissingen-Nippenburg
 Blankenstein
 Bolza
 Bombelles
 Breunner
 Breyner
 Buttler
 Brunswick
 Cavriani
 Chamaré
 Chotek
 Crenneville-Folliot
 Csáky
 Csáky-Pallavicini de Körösszegh et Adorján
 Csekonics
 Czebrian
 Cziráky
 Degenfeld-Schonburg
 Dessewffy
 Dezasse
 Draskovich
 Eltz-Kempenich
 Erdődy
 Esterházy
 Festetics/Feshtetich
 Forgách
 Gyulai
 Gyürky
 Hadik
 Haller
 Harrach
| width="30%" align="left" valign="top" style="border:0"|
 Horváth-Tholdy
 Hoyos
 Hugonnai
 Hunyady
 Kálnoky
 Karácsonyi
 Károlyi
 Keglevich de Buzin; family of the Military Frontier with Jus gladii since 1526 explicitly mentioned in the Peace Treaty of Karlowitz in 1699.
 Khevenmüller-Metsch
 Khuen-Belasi
 Khuen-Héderváry
 Kinsky
 Kornis
 Kottulinsky
 Königsegg-Aulendorf
 Königsegg-Rottenfels
 Kulmer
 Kún
 Lamberg
 Lázár
 Lazsánszky
 Ledóchowski
 Lónyay
 Mailáth
 Mészkő
 Migazzi
 Mikes
 Mittrowsky
 De la Motte
 Nádasdy
 Nákó
 Nemes
 Nesselrode
 Niczky
 Nugent
 Nyáry
 Orshich
 Paar
 Pálffy
 Pallavicini
 Péchy
 Pejácsevich
 Pellegrini
 Pergen
 Pongrácz
| width="30%" align="left" valign="top" style="border:0"|
 Porcia
 Ráday
 Renoldi-Staud
 Reviczky
 Richter de Mocz
 Rudwo-Rudzinsky
 Rhédey
 Sáry
 Schafftgotsch
 Schiedegg
 Schönborn
 Schwartzenberg
 Scilern
 Serényi
 Sermage
 Sigray
 Somssich
 Spannochi
 Starhemberg
 Stainlein
 Stubenberg
 Szapáry
 Széchényi
 Szécsen
 Szirmay
 Szilágyi
 Sztáray
 Teleki
 Tholdalagi
 Thoroczkay
 Thun und Hohenstein
 Tige
 Tisza
 Török
 Traun
 Trauttmansdorff
 Ugrinovics
 Vay
 Vécsey
 Voikffy
 Waldstein
 Wartensleben
 Wass
 Wenckheim
 Wilczek
 Wilczek-Gratz
 Windisch-Graetz
 Zay
 Zichy

Notes

Nobility
Lists of countesses
Lists of counts
Counts